Eduardo González-Gallarza Iragorri (18 April 1898 – 24 May 1986) was a Spanish general who served as Minister of the Air of Spain between 1945 and 1957, during the Francoist dictatorship.

References

1898 births
1986 deaths
Defence ministers of Spain
Government ministers during the Francoist dictatorship